Mateo Pavlović (born 9 June 1990) is a Croatian professional footballer who plays as a defender for  club Saint-Étienne, on loan from Croatian Football League club Rijeka.

Club career

NK Zagreb
Pavlović came through the youth system at NK Zagreb. He made his senior team debut in a 4–0 league defeat to Hajduk Split on 9 November 2008. He was a regular first team player in NK Zagreb's Prva HNL campaigns for the 2008–09, 2009–10 and 2010–11 seasons, and has also participated in the Croatian Cup.

The central defender was a reported transfer target for a number of major European teams. In April 2011, Croatian sports magazine Sportske novosti said that scouts from Bayern Munich, Werder Bremen, VfB Stuttgart and Zenit St Petersburg had watched him in recent matches. In May 2011, Croatian newspaper 24sata alleged that former French international Christian Karembeu, now a scout, had filmed the player with a view to recommending him to clubs in Ligue 1.

Werder Bremen
On 17 December 2012, Pavlović transferred to Werder Bremen signing a contract until 30 June 2016.

On 5 February 2014, after making just four first team appearances in over a year, Pavlovic joined Hungarian side Ferencvárosi TC on loan until the end of the 2013–14 season. The loan was extended by another year in July 2014. Having made 33 appearances for Ferencváros over 1.5 seasons, he returned to Werder Bremen.

In January 2016, Werder Bremen announced that Pavlović would be used neither in the first team nor in the reserves. In February, the club was still looking to offload the player whose contract was due to end in summer 2016.

Angers
In June 2016, Pavlović signed a two-year contract with Ligue 1 side Angers SCO.

Amiens
On 1 September 2021, he joined Amiens in Ligue 2 on a two-year contract.

Rijeka
On 22 June 2022, he joined Prva HNL side Rijeka.

International career
Pavlović has represented Bosnia-Herzegovina at under-17 level, and Croatia at under-19, under-20 and under-21 levels. He made his competitive debut for the Croatia under-21s in a 1–0 loss to the Georgia under-21s in a June 2011 qualifying match for the 2013 UEFA European Under-21 Football Championship.

Personal life
His father Luka is a football manager who worked for NK Zagreb and is head of Rijeka's football academy.

Career statistics

Club

Honours
Ferencváros
Hungarian Cup: 2014–15
Hungarian League Cup: 2014–15

References

External links
 

1990 births
Living people
Sportspeople from Mostar
Association football defenders
Croats of Bosnia and Herzegovina
Bosnia and Herzegovina footballers
Bosnia and Herzegovina youth international footballers
Croatian footballers
Croatia youth international footballers
Croatia under-21 international footballers
NK Zagreb players
SV Werder Bremen players
SV Werder Bremen II players
Ferencvárosi TC footballers
Angers SCO players
Amiens SC players
HNK Rijeka players
AS Saint-Étienne players
Croatian Football League players
Bundesliga players
Nemzeti Bajnokság I players
3. Liga players
Ligue 1 players
Ligue 2 players
Croatian expatriate footballers
Expatriate footballers in Germany
Expatriate footballers in Hungary
Expatriate footballers in France
Croatian expatriate sportspeople in Germany
Croatian expatriate sportspeople in Hungary
Croatian expatriate sportspeople in France